AXN is a Portuguese pay television channel. It is the Portuguese version of the AXN network, owned by Sony. It was a Cabovisão exclusive in its beginnings, but now it is available in all operators and platforms. It's one of the most watched channels on pay-TV in Portugal, competing with FOX, SIC Notícias, Canal Panda, Disney Channel and Canal Hollywood.

The channel have two feeds: one for Portugal and Angola, and a second for Mozambique.

Sister channels

AXN White
AXN White first launched in Portugal on 7 May 2012, replacing Sony Entertainment Television. It focuses on comedy and romantic series and movies.

AXN Movies
AXN Movies was launched on 17 February 2020 replacing AXN Black, it is dedicated to movies.

Former channels

Sony Entertainment Television
Sony Entertainment Television was launched in 2008 in Portugal. SET was replaced by AXN White on 14 April 2012 at 8 hours, followed by SET Spain replaced by AXN White on 7 May 2012.

Animax
A week-end Animax block was added to AXN on 20 October 2007, which ended in September 2008. It was launched as a full channel on 12 April 2008. Dedicated to anime, Animax added live-action shows in 2009. On 9 May 2011, Animax was replaced by AXN Black.

Shows broadcast by AXN in Portugal

Magazines
 Tempo Sincro
 Insert Coin

Fiction
 CSI: Crime Scene Investigation
 CSI: Miami
 CSI: NY
 NCIS
 In Plain Sight
 Castle
 Leverage
 Memphis Beat
 Law and Order: UK
 The Mentalist
 Criminal Minds
 Perception
 The Borgias
 Once Upon a Time
 Las Vegas
 Missing
 The Firm
 The Pillars of the Earth
 The Mob Doctor
 Sherlock
 Hannibal
 XIII: The Series
 Private
 The Confession
 Alarm für Cobra 11 – Die Autobahnpolizei
 Lasko – Die Faust Gottes
 Cybill
 Homicide: Life on the Street

External links

AXN Portugal at LyngSat Address

References

Sony Pictures Television
Sony subsidiaries
Television stations in Portugal
Television networks in Portugal
AXN
Sony Pictures Entertainment
Television channels and stations established in 2004
2004 establishments in Portugal